Kurcheyevo (Kürsäy) is a rural locality (a selo) in Buzyurovsky Selsoviet, Bakalinsky District, Bashkortostan, Russia. The population was 245 as of 2010. There are 2 streets.

Geography 
Kurcheyevo is located 31 km southwest of Bakaly (the district's administrative centre) by road. Buzyurovo is the nearest rural locality.

References 

Rural localities in Bakalinsky District